Novosilka is a village in Volnovakha Raion (district) in Donetsk Oblast of eastern Ukraine, at about  west by south from the centre of Donetsk city.

The village came under attack by Russian forces in May 2022, during the Russian invasion of Ukraine.

References

Villages in Volnovakha Raion